Bundaberg Brewed Drinks Pty Ltd is an Australian family-owned business that brews non-alcoholic beverages. Based in Bundaberg, Queensland, they export to over 61 countries across the globe and they are most known for their ginger beer and other carbonated beverages.

History 
The company was established in Bundaberg in 1960 as a bottling and fermenting business. In 1968, Mr. and Mrs. Fleming (senior) along with Cliff and Lee Fleming, bought the business, then known as Electra Breweries. From then on, it was run by mother, father, son and daughter. Over the years, the company has seen growth in sales and brand recognition, both domestically and internationally.

Circa 2011 the company established its own ginger farm to ensure an adequate supply of ginger.

In March 2018, the company entered into a partnership with PepsiCo to distribute their beverages across the United States, although the two remain separate companies.

Product Range
There are 13 flavours in the range as well as 3 diet varieties. The flavours include:

 Ginger Beer
 Lemon, Lime and Bitters
 Sarsaparilla / Root Beer
 Burgundee Creaming Soda
 Peach
 Pink Grapefruit
 Guava
 Blood Orange
 Passionfruit
 Apple Cider 
 Traditional Lemonade
 Pineapple and Coconut
 Tropical Mango

The Diet range includes:

 Diet Ginger Beer
 Diet Lemon Lime and Bitters
 Diet Sarsaparilla / Root Beer

There is also a Limited Release brew, Spiced Ginger Beer, that is only available at key times of the year.

To celebrate the 50th Anniversary of Bundaberg Brewed Drinks, a limited edition brew, Ginger Beer & Lemon Myrtle, crafted by company founder Cliff Fleming, was released.

Royal Crown Draft Premium Cola is produced under licence and is not available for purchase within Australia, except at the brewery tourist facility known as "The Barrel".

Tourism

In 2005, Bundaberg Brewed Drinks opened their tourist facility, the Bundaberg Barrel, one of Australia's Big Things in Bundaberg East. The Barrel has a 3D hologram video, interactive displays on the brewing process and taste testing.

See also
 List of brand name soft drinks products
 List of soft drink flavors
 List of soft drinks by country

References

External links
 

Australian drinks
Soft drinks
Bundaberg East, Queensland
Food and drink companies of Australia
Family-owned companies of Australia
Companies based in Queensland
Drink companies of Australia
Food and drink companies established in 1960
Non-alcoholic drinks
Tourist attractions in Bundaberg
Australian companies established in 1960
Soft drinks manufacturers
Culture of Queensland